Srikrishnanagar is a village within the jurisdiction of the Jaynagar police station in the Jaynagar I CD block in the Baruipur subdivision of the South 24 Parganas district in the Indian state of West Bengal.

Geography

Demographics
As per 2011 Census of India, Srikrishnanagar had a total population of 5,064.

Transport
Gocharan-Dhosa Road links Srikrishnanagar to the State Highway 1.

Gocharan railway station is located nearby.

Healthcare
There is a primary health centre, with 6 beds, at Momrejgarh (Goalberia) (PO Srikrishnanagar).

References

Villages in South 24 Parganas district
Neighbourhoods in Jaynagar Majilpur